"Love Again" is a song by Australian rapper and singer the Kid Laroi. It was released on 27 January 2023 through Columbia Records as the lead single from his upcoming debut studio album, The First Time (2023). The song was written by Laroi alongside Billy Walsh and producers Cirkut and Omer Fedi.

Background and promotion
"Love Again" was one of Laroi's unreleased songs that had been circulating on social media the year before. He first unveiled and performed the song at the 2022 iHeartRadio Jingle Ball. The release date was revealed at the end of the music video for the promotional single, "I Can't Go Back to the Way It Was (Intro)". The song was featured in Laroi's 'Wild Dreams' Fortnite experience as part of his partnership with Epic Games.

Composition and lyrics
On "Love Again", Laroi mourns what once was a past love, and questions whether or not it will ever return, singing over a soft, acoustic guitar and fuzzed out instrumentation. He sings on the chorus, "Can we find love again?/ Is this time the end?/ Tell me." Billboard Jason Lipshutz wrote that the song "recalls the raw acoustic nerve" of Laroi's breakout hit, "Without You", and "offers clipped, unflinching rhetorical questions while trying to find resolution in a relationship".

Commercial performance
In Laroi's native Australia, "Love Again" debuted at number 14 on the ARIA Singles Chart. The following week, the song climbed to number six, marking his sixth top-10 hit on the chart. It entered the UK Singles Chart at number 18 before rising to number 16 a week later.

Music video
The official music video for "Love Again", directed by Adrian Villagomez, premiered with the single's release on 27 January 2023. It sees Laroi in a toxic relationship with Londond0ll, a life-size blond doll that Laroi followed on Instagram earlier in the week. The two are seen driving around together, cuddling on the beach, and getting into arguments before rekindling their love at the end of the video.

Credits and personnel
Credits adapted from Tidal.
 The Kid Laroi – vocals, songwriting
 Cirkut – production, songwriting, programming, recording, synthesiser, vocal production
 Omer Fedi – production, songwriting, bass, guitar, programming, synthesiser, vocal production
 Billy Walsh – songwriting
 Șerban Ghenea – mixing

Charts

Release history

References

2023 singles
2023 songs
Columbia Records singles
The Kid Laroi songs
Song recordings produced by Omer Fedi
Songs written by Omer Fedi
Songs written by the Kid Laroi